Dear, Don't Be Afraid ( or ) is a 2015 3D Chinese suspense horror thriller film directed by Yu Dange and Cao Anjun. The film was released on July 10, 2015.

Cast
Du Yuchen
Ren Peng
Wang Qianhang
Yin Guiyong
Liu Jingyi
Han Xuantong

Reception
The film earned  at the Chinese box office.

References

External links

2015 horror thriller films
2015 3D films
2015 horror films
Chinese 3D films
Chinese horror thriller films